Grupo Desportivo Interclube, usually known as Interclube or Inter de Luanda, is an Angolan football club based in Luanda. The club is attached to the Angolan police force. Interclube is one of the two clubs based in Luanda (the other one is 1º de Agosto) with a stadium of its own as all the remaining clubs in the capital play their home matches at the state-owned 11 de Novembro and Coqueiros. The stadium, built in 2004, has an 10,000-seat capacity.

History
Founded on February 28, 1976 by the then Ministry of the Interior Santana André Pitra aka Petroff as Inter de Luanda, it won its first title, the Angolan Cup, in 1986.

In 2005, the club finished 9th in the Angolan first division. In that year, it also reached the domestic cup final, but was defeated 1–0 by ASA.

Two players from Inter represented the Angola national team in its first FIFA World Cup tournament, in 2006 in Germany: Miloy and Mário.

Stadium
Interclube is one of two clubs in Angola to play their home games in their own stadium, the Estádio 22 de Junho.

Honours
Angolan League: 2
Winner: 2007, 2010

Angolan Cup: 3
Winner: 1986, 2003, 2011
Runners-up: (6) 1985, 1989, 2000, 2005, 2010, 2021.

Angolan SuperCup: 4
Winner: 1986, 2001, 2008, 2012
Runners-up: (1) 2011

Recent seasons
Interclube's season-by-season performance:

League and cup positions

Performance in CAF competitions

CAF Champions League: 2 appearances
2008 – Third Round
2011 – Second Round

CAF Confederation Cup: 7 appearances
2004 – First Round
2005 – First Round
2006 – Group Stage
2008 – Group Stage
2011 – Semi-finals
2012 – Group Stage

CAF Cup Winners' Cup: 2 appearances
1987 – First Round
2001 – Finalist

Players and staff

Players

Staff

Manager history

 João Gonçalves da Silva (1981)
 Severino Cardoso Smica (1982–83)
 Joka Santinho (1984–87)  
 Filipe Dikizeko  (1988)
 Joka Santinho (1989)
 Severino Cardoso Smica (1989–90)
 Carlos Alves (1990–91)
 João António André Cuca (1991–92)
 João Machado (1992)
 Raúl Kinanga (1995–97)
 João António André Cuca (1997–99)
 Arnaldo Chaves (1999)
 Raúl Kinanga (2000)
 Oliveira Gonçalves (2000)
 Veselin Jelušić (2001)
 Oliveira Gonçalves (2001)
 Itamar Amorim (2002) 
 Raúl Kinanga (2002–03)
 Zoran Pešić (2003–04) 
 Raúl Kinanga (2004)
 Georg Tripp (2005)
 Romeu Silva (2006)
 Raúl Kinanga (2006)
 Carlos Mozer (2006–08)  
 Augusto Inácio (2008–09)
 João Arsénio Túbia (2009)
 Álvaro Magalhães (2009–11) 
 António Caldas (2011–12)  
 Bernardino Pedroto (2012–13)
 Mirsad Omerhodžić (2014)
 Ilian Iliev (2014–15)
 Veselin Jelušić (2015)
 Filipe Moreira (2015–16)
 Paulo Torres (2016–18)
 Rui Garcia (2018-19)
 Bruno Ribeiro (2018-19)
 Ivo Campos (2019-20–)

Other sports
 Interclube Basketball
 Interclube Handball

External links
 Official club site
 Girabola.com profile
 Zerozero.pt profile
 Facebook profile

References

G.D. Interclube
Football clubs in Angola
Football clubs in Luanda
Association football clubs established in 1953
1953 establishments in Angola
Sports clubs in Angola